Omphalotrochidae is an extinct taxonomic family of Paleozoic molluscs (gastropods?) with anisostrophically coiled shells of uncertain position (Gastropoda?) (according to the taxonomy of the Gastropoda by Bouchet & Rocroi, 2005).

Taxonomy 
The taxonomy of the Gastropoda by Bouchet & Rocroi, 2005 places Omphalotrochidae in the superfamilia Euomphaloidea within the Paleozoic molluscs with anisostrophically coiled shells of uncertain position (Gastropoda?). This family has no subfamilies.

Genera 
Genera in the family Omphalotrochidae include:
 Omphalotrochus Meek, 1864 - type genus of the family Omphalotrochidae

References 

Prehistoric gastropods